Edward-Isaac Dovere is an American journalist who is a senior reporter for CNN. He was previously a staff writer for The Atlantic and Chief Washington Correspondent for Politico.

Biography
After growing up in Manhattan, Dovere graduated with a B.A. from Johns Hopkins University and received a M.A. in intellectual history from the University of Chicago. He is the founding editor of Manhattan Media publications City Hall and The Capitol (now City and State). In 2018, he won the Merriman Smith Memorial Award for an article written while he was covering Barack Obama's trip to Havana.

His book about the Democratic Party and the 2020 United States presidential election, Battle for the Soul: Inside the Democrats' Campaigns to Defeat Trump, was published in May 2021 by Penguin Random House.

Personal life
In 2011, he married Sarah Margalit Slobodien.

References

American magazine journalists
The Atlantic (magazine) people
Politico people
1980 births
Living people
21st-century American journalists
21st-century American male writers
American male journalists
Johns Hopkins University alumni
University of Chicago alumni